Below is a list of Civil Service Ministers in the Government of France since the establishment of the Fourth Republic. Since 6 July 2020, Amélie de Montchalin has been Minister of Public Transformation and Service under Prime Minister Jean Castex.


List

Fourth Republic

Under Vincent Auriol
 19 February – 4 May 1947: Maurice Thorez, Minister of State
 4 May – 22 October 1947: Pierre-Henri Teitgen, Minister of State
 26 November 1947 – 2 July 1950: Jean Biondi, Secretary of State
 2 July – 12 July 1950: Paul Giacobbi, Minister of State
 12 July 1950 – 11 August 1951: Pierre Métayer, Secretary of State
 20 January – 8 March 1952: Bernard Lafay, Secretary of State

Under René Coty
 30 June – 12 November 1954: Jean Masson, Secretary of State
 12 November 1954 – 23 February 1955: René Billières, Secretary of State
 1 February 1956 – 13 June 1957: Pierre Métayer, Secretary of State
 17 June – 6 November 1957: Jean Meunier, Secretary of State
 11 November 1957 – 14 May 1958: Raymond Marcellin, Secretary of State
 14 June 1958 – 8 January 1959: Guy Mollet, Minister of State

Fifth Republic

Under Charles de Gaulle
 8 January – 28 May 1959: Pierre Chatenet, Secretary of State
 24 July 1959 – 15 January 1960: Louis Joxe, Secretary of State
 19 March 1960 – 14 April 1962: Pierre Guillaumat, Minister delegate
 14 April – 28 November 1962: Jean de Broglie, Secretary of State
 6 December 1962 – 6 April 1967: Louis Joxe, Minister of State
 6 April 1967 – 31 May 1968: Edmond Michelet, Minister of State
 31 May – 10 July 1968: Robert Boulin, Minister
 12 July 1968 – 20 June 1969: Philippe Malaud, Secretary of State

Under Georges Pompidou
 22 June 1969 – 2 April 1973: Philippe Malaud, Secretary of State
 20 April 1973 – 27 February 1974: Paul Dijoud, Secretary of State
 23 October 1973 – 27 February 1974: Philippe Malaud, Minister
 1 March – 28 May 1974: Christian Poncelet, Secretary of State

Under Valéry Giscard d'Estaing
 28 May – 29 October 1974: Roger Poudonson, Secretary of State
 29 October 1974 – 27 August 1976: Gabriel Péronnet, Secretary of State
 27 August 1976 – 6 April 1978: Maurice Ligot, Secretary of State
 2 April 1978 – 22 May 1981: Jacques Dominati, Secretary of State

Under François Mitterrand
 21 May – 23 June 1981: Catherine Lalumière, Secretary of State
 23 June 1981 – 23 July 1984: Anicet Le Pors, Minister delegate
 23 July 1984 – 20 March 1986: Jean Le Garrec, Secretary of State
 20 March 1986 – 12 May 1988: Hervé de Charette, Minister delegate
 12 May 1988 – 16 May 1991: Michel Durafour, Minister
 16 May 1991 – 28 March 1992: Jean-Pierre Soisson, Minister of State
 4 April 1992 – 30 March 1993: Michel Delebarre, Minister of State
 30 March 1993 – 18 May 1995: André Rossinot, Minister

Under Jacques Chirac
 18 May – 6 November 1995: Jean Puech, Minister
 6 November 1995 – 4 June 1997 : Dominique Perben, Minister
 4 June 1997 – 27 March 2000: Émile Zuccarelli, Minister
 27 March 2000 – 7 May 2002: Michel Sapin, Minister
 7 May 2002 – 30 March 2004: Jean-Paul Delevoye, Minister
 31 March 2004 – 31 May 2005: Renaud Dutreil, Minister
 2 June 2005 – 15 May 2007: Christian Jacob, Minister

Under Nicolas Sarkozy
 19 June 2007 – 23 June 2009: André Santini, Secretary of State
 22 March 2010 – 29 May 2011: Georges Tron, Secretary of State
 29 June 2011 – 10 May 2012: François Sauvadet, Minister

Under François Hollande
 16 May 2012 – 11 February 2016: Marylise Lebranchu, Minister
 11 February 2016 – 15 May 2017: Annick Girardin, Minister

Under Emmanuel Macron
 6 July 2020 – Present: Amélie de Montchalin, Minister

External links
 

Civil Service
Civil Service